Martin Baxa (born 16 September 1975) is a Czech politician who has served as the Czech Minister of Culture in Petr Fiala's Cabinet since December 2021. He has been a member of the Chamber of Deputies (MP) for the Civic Democratic Party (ODS) since October 2017. He previously served as Mayor of Plzeň from 2010 to 2014, and again from 2018 to 2022.

Early life
Baxa was born in Plzeň in 1975. He studied at a local grammar school and then Masaryk University from 1994 to 1999. He subsequently became a teacher at a grammar School in Plzeň.

Political career 
Baxa became a member of the Plzeň Municipal Assembly in 2002. From 2004 to 2008 he was a member of the Regional Council.

Baxa led ODS during municipal elections in Plzeň in 2010, the only regional city where the party won that year. Baxa subsequently became the Mayor of Plzeň, the youngest in the city's history. Baxa led ODS again in the 2014 municipal election, in which ODS were expected to lose heavily but eventually finished narrowly behind ANO 2011. After ODS formed a coalition with the Czech Social Democratic Party, Christian and Democratic Union – Czechoslovak People's Party and Citizens Patriots, Baxa switched roles with his 1. Deputy Mayor Martin Zrzavecký who became the new mayor.

Baxa led ODS during the regional elections in Plzeň in 2016, with the party finishing third and becoming part of the regional government. Baxa himself received the highest number of preferential votes.

Baxa stood for parliament in the 2017 legislative elections and became a member of the Chamber of Deputies. On 13 January 2018, he was elected Deputy Chairman of ODS.

On 17 December 2021, Baxa was sworn in as Minister of Culture of the Czech Republic in Petr Fiala's Cabinet.

Personal life
Baxa married his long-term partner Simona Klečková on 2 August 2015.

References

1975 births
Living people
Civic Democratic Party (Czech Republic) mayors
Civic Democratic Party (Czech Republic) MPs
Young Conservatives (Czech Republic) politicians
Mayors of places in the Czech Republic
Politicians from Plzeň
Members of the Chamber of Deputies of the Czech Republic (2017–2021)
Members of the Chamber of Deputies of the Czech Republic (2021–2025)
Civic Democratic Party (Czech Republic) Government ministers
Culture ministers of the Czech Republic
Masaryk University alumni